The a cappella choir Zürcher Vokalisten was founded in Zurich, Switzerland, in 2002 by its current director Christian Dillig. The choir comprises about 30 singers. Its focus is on more challenging a cappella compositions from a wide range of styles and periods with a more recent special attention to composers from Northern and Eastern countries. The choir has presented about 30 different programmes since its foundation, the range of which extends from the Renaissance madrigal to vocal jazz.

Programs which focus on particular topics such as "Lachen und Weinen", "Wind und Wetter", "Musik zum Frieden", "Wiege des Jahres" have been contrasted by programs with an emphasis on compositions from particular regions such as the Nordic countries, the Baltic countries, Russia or France. In addition, the choir has realized two Jazz-projects and repeatedly returns to performing oratories such as King David by Arthur Honegger, Fauré's Requiem and Rossini's Petite messe solennelle" . Particular highlights in its history were Duruflé's Requiem (2008), the Mass for double choir by Frank Martin (composer) (2012), which was performed together with the professional chamber choir Cantus Uschgorod (Ukraine), Missa de Lumine by David Haladjian, performed together with the Armenian Chamber Players (2009), and the Three-Choir-Project presenting Max Reger's "Vater unser" together with the choirs Notabene, Basel, and the Vokalensemble Novantiqua, Bern (2011).

And also in 2013, the label Spektral published the choir's first CD "Blue Bird". In spring 2014 the choir toured Slovenia and gave concerts in Ajdovščina und Ljubljana.

Sources 

Homepage of Zürcher Vokalisten

A cappella musical groups
Swiss choirs
Musical groups established in 2002